Tunis–Carthage International Airport) is the international airport of Tunis, the capital of Tunisia. It serves as the home base for Tunisair, Tunisair Express, Nouvelair Tunisia, and Tunisavia. The airport is named for the historic city of Carthage, located just east of the airport.

History

The history of the airport dates back to 1920 when the first seaplane base in Tunisia was built on the Lake of Tunis for the seaplanes of Compagnie Aéronavale. The Tunis Airfield opened in 1938, serving around 5,800 passengers annually on the Paris-Tunis route.

During World War II, the airport was used by the United States Air Force Twelfth Air Force as a headquarters and command control base for the Italian Campaign of 1943. The following known units were assigned:

 HQ, 87th Fighter Group, 22 November – 14 December 1943
 3d Reconnaissance Group, 13 June – 8 December 1943, Lockheed F-4/F-5 Lightning
 5th Reconnaissance Group, 8 September – 8 December 1943, Lockheed F-4/F-5 Lightning

Once the combat units moved to Italy, Air Transport Command used the airport as a major transshipment hub for cargo, transiting aircraft and personnel. It functioned as a stopover en route to Algiers airport or to Mellaha Field near Tripoli, Libya on the North African Cairo-Dakar transport route. Later, as the Allied forces advanced, it also flew personnel and cargo to Naples, Italy.

Construction on the Tunis-Carthage Airport, which was fully funded by France, began in 1944, and in 1948 the airport become the main hub for Tunisair. The airline started operations with Douglas DC-3s flying from Tunis-Carthage Airport to Marseille, Ajaccio, Bastia, Algiers, Rome, Sfax, Djerba, and Tripoli, Libya. The passenger traffic grew steadily from 1951 when 56,400 passengers were carried, 33,400 of them by Air France. The airport offered a convenient stop-over point for several other French airlines over the years, including Aigle Azur with a stop in Tunis on the Paris-Brazzaville route, and TAI (Intercontinental Air Transport) with a stop in Tunis on its Paris-Saigon route. Among foreign companies,  the TWA was present, whose lines Rome-New York and Rome-Bombay made stop in Tunis, and the LAI (Italian company) which made the connection Rome-Palermo-Tunis.

In 2005 the terminal was expanded another , and now has a capacity of 500,000 more passengers annually. On 23 September 2006 a new terminal opened for charter flights.

Airlines and destinations

Passenger

Cargo

Other facilities
The head office of the Tunisian Civil Aviation and Airports Authority (OACA) is on the airport property.

Ground transportation 
The airport is served by bus lines and taxis, but not by a railway (the L'Aéroport station on the TGM suburban rail line does not actually serve it, being several kilometers distant).

Accidents and incidents
On 7 May 2002, EgyptAir Flight 843, a Boeing 737 from Cairo crashed 4 miles from Tunis–Carthage International Airport. Of the 62 people on board, 14 were killed.

See also
 List of the busiest airports in Africa by passenger traffic
 List of airports in Tunisia

References

External links
 
 Tunisian Civil Aviation and Airports Authority (OACA)
 
 
 

Airports in Tunisia
Tunis
Airfields of the United States Army Air Forces Air Transport Command in North Africa
Airfields of the United States Army Air Forces in Tunisia
World War II airfields in Tunisia
Airports established in 1938